Lirkhun (also Romanized as Līrkhūn; also known as Līrhān) is a village in Mazu Rural District, Alvar-e Garmsiri District, Andimeshk County, Khuzestan Province, Iran. At the 2006 census, its population was 22, in 5 families.

References 

Populated places in Andimeshk County